Ireland To-day was a literary magazine that ran from June 1936 to March 1938. It was edited by Jim O'Donovan and published work by many emerging and established Irish writers of the time, including Brian Coffey, Daniel Corkery, Frank O'Connor Denis Devlin, Michael McLaverty, Ewart Milne, Seán Ó Faoláin, Liam O'Flaherty, and Mervyn Wall. Aloys Fleischmann wrote articles on Irish music in the magazine.

Politically liberal, Ireland To-day was one of the few Irish publications to support the Republican side during the 
Spanish Civil War. This position altered, however, when the socialist Owen Sheehy Skeffington was replaced as contributor of 'A Foreign Commentary'.

References

Ricorso. Retrieved on 30 March 2010.

Literary magazines published in Ireland
Defunct literary magazines published in Europe
Defunct magazines published in Ireland
Magazines established in 1936
Magazines disestablished in 1938